Leigh East is an electoral ward in Leigh, England. It forms part of Wigan Metropolitan Borough Council, as well as the parliamentary constituency of Leigh.

Councillors 
The ward is represented by three councillors: Keith Cunliffe (Lab), Anita Thorpe (Lab), and Frederick Walker.

References

Wigan Metropolitan Borough Council Wards